AAIIB may refer to:
 Air Accident and Incident Investigation Board of Cyprus
 Aircraft Accident and Incident Investigation Bureau of the Republic of Latvia, now the Transport Accident and Incident Investigation Bureau
 Aircraft Accident and Inquiry Investigation Board, a division of the Civil Aviation Authority of the Philippines